Rik de Voest and Ashley Fisher are the defending champions, but de Voest chose not to participate, and only Fisher competed that year.
Fisher partnered with Bobby Reynolds, but Stephen Huss and Ross Hutchins defeated them 7–5, 6–4, in the final.

Seeds

Draw

Draw

External links
Draw

China Open
2008 China Open (tennis)

pl:China Open 2008 - mężczyźni